The 2023 Rally Mexico (also known as the Rally Guanajuato México 2023) was a motor racing event for rally cars held over four days between 16 and 19 March 2023. It marked the nineteenth running of the Rally Mexico, and was the third round of the 2023 World Rally Championship, World Rally Championship-2 and World Rally Championship-3.

Sébastien Ogier and Julien Ingrassia were the defending rally winners. However, Ingrassia did defend his title as he retired from the sport at the end of 2021 season. Pontus Tidemand and Patrick Barth were the defending rally winners in the WRC-2 category. Marco Bulacia Wilkinson and Giovanni Bernacchini were the defending rally winners in the WRC-3 category.

Ogier and Vincent Landais won their second victory of the season. Their team, Toyota Gazoo Racing WRT, were the manufacturers' winners. Gus Greensmith and Jonas Andersson and Patrick Barth were the winners in the WRC-2 category, while Diego Dominguez Jr. and Rogelio Peñate were the winners in the WRC-3 category.

Background

Entry list
The following crews were entered into the rally. The event was open to crews competing in the World Rally Championship, its support categories, the World Rally Championship-2, World Rally Championship-3, Junior World Rally Championship and privateer entries that were not registered to score points in any championship. Ten were entered under Rally1 regulations, as were ten Rally2 crews in the World Rally Championship-2 and one Rally3 crew in the World Rally Championship-3.

Itinerary
All dates and times are CST (UTC-6).

Report

WRC Rally1
Rally Mexico opened with 2 runs around a superspecial stage in Guanajuato City, and it was Ott Tänak and Martin Järveoja who was fastest on both runs, taking a 1.7 second lead over Kalle Rovanpera and Jonne Halttunen into Friday. However, on the first stage of the day, the 29-kilometer El Chocolate stage, the Estonian crew's turbo failed, causing them to drop to twenty-ninth place and almost 8 minutes behind the leaders, Esapekka Lappi and Janne Ferm. Lappi and Ferm would lead the rally at the end of Friday by 5.3 seconds, ahead of 8-time World Champion Sébastien Ogier and his co-driver Vincent Landais.

The rally leaders had a serious accident on the opening stage of Saturday, their Hyundai i20 going rear first into a telegraph pole. The car then caught fire, causing the stage to be red-flagged. Thierry Neuville and Martin Wydaeghe won the following 3 stages, whilst Ogier and Landais had a 29 second lead over Toyota teammates Elfyn Evans and Scott Martin. Ogier would extend his lead to 36 seconds, as his teammates Evans and Martin's gap to third place Neuville and Wydaeghe was reduced to 4.3 seconcds.

Evans and Martin were locked in a battle with Neuville and Martin for second place, the Belgians closing the gap to 2.7 seconds as they begun the Power Stage, a suspected bent suspension arm costing Evans and Martin on the penultimate stage. In Power Stage, Neuville and Wydaeghe gained 3.1 seconds on Evans and Martin to claim second place by 4 tenths of a second. Ogier and Landais won the rally by 27.5 seconds and also won the Power Stage by 2.1 seconds, meaning they lead the championship by 3 points over Neuville and Wydaeghe.

Classification

Special stages

Championship standings

WRC-2 Rally2

Classification

Special stages

Championship standings

WRC-3 Rally3

Classification

Special stages

Championship standings

Notes

References

External links
  
 2023 Rally Mexico at eWRC-results.com
 2023 Rally Mexico at rally-maps.com 

2023 in Mexican motorsport
Mexico
March 2023 sports events in Mexico
2023